Vitaliy Gennadyevich Denisov (born 23 February 1987) is an Uzbek professional footballer of Belarusian origin, who plays as a left-back for Sogdiana Jizzakh. He is a former member of the Uzbekistan national football team.

He is the son of Gennadi Denisov.

Career

CSKA Moscow
In 2003, Denisov signed a contract with CSKA Moscow. Although he didn't play in a match, CSKA won the UEFA Cup in 2005, and Denisov became the first Uzbek football player to win a European Cup.

In 2006 he was loaned to Spartak Nizhny Novgorod who were then competing in the Russian First Division.

Dnipro Dnipropetrovsk
In January 2007, he was transferred to the Ukrainian Premier League side Dnipro Dnipropetrovsk for a fee of 2.5 million €. He played there from 2007 into the 2012–2013 season, making over 160 appearances.

Lokomotiv Moscow
On 13 January 2013, Denisov agreed to the terms of a 3-year contract with Lokomotiv Moscow on a free transfer. On 5 August 2013 he scored his first goal club for Lokomotiv Moscow on match against Krasnodar. On 26 August 2013 Denisov recorded 3 assists in a Russian Premier League match in a 5–0 Lokomotiv rout over Rostov

In August 2013 Denisov won monthly contest among Lokomotiv's fans and was named Player of the Month. He won this prize for the second time in the following May. At the end of the 2013–14 season, Denisov was named the best left-back in the Russian Premier League by the Executive Committee of the Russian Football Union.

On 23 December 2013 Denisov was named Uzbekistan Player of the Year.

Krylia Sovetov Samara
On 21 August 2018, he joined PFC Krylia Sovetov Samara on loan until the end of 2018.

Rubin Kazan
On 20 June 2019, he signed a one-season contract with Rubin Kazan. On 11 January 2020 his Rubin contract was terminated by mutual consent.

FNL clubs
On 16 January 2020 he joined Russian Football National League club Rotor Volgograd. He left Rotor on 18 June 2020.

On 20 September 2020 he signed a one-season contract with Tom Tomsk.

On 8 June 2021, he moved to Baltika Kaliningrad. His contract with Baltika was terminated by mutual consent on 1 December 2021.

International
Denisov made his debut for the Uzbekistan national football team on 22 February 2006 in an AFC Asian Cup qualification match against Bangladesh, in which Uzbekistan won 5–0.

Honours

Club
CSKA Moscow
UEFA cup: 2004–05
Russian Cup: 2004–05

Lokomotiv Moscow
Russian Premier League: 2017–18
Russian Cup: 2014–15, 2016–17

Individual
 Uzbekistan Player of the Year: 2013
 Best left-back in the Russian Football Premier League: 2013–2014

Career statistics

Club

Notes

National team
Goals for Senior National Team

References

External links

Profile at official FC Lokomotiv website

1987 births
Living people
Sportspeople from Tashkent
Uzbekistani people of Belarusian descent
Uzbekistan international footballers
Uzbekistani expatriate footballers
Association football defenders
Expatriate footballers in Russia
2007 AFC Asian Cup players
2015 AFC Asian Cup players
PFC CSKA Moscow players
Ukrainian Premier League players
FC Lokomotiv Moscow players
PFC Krylia Sovetov Samara players
FC Rubin Kazan players
FC Rotor Volgograd players
FC Tom Tomsk players
FC Baltika Kaliningrad players
Russian Premier League players
Russian First League players
Footballers at the 2006 Asian Games
Uzbekistani footballers
Uzbekistani expatriate sportspeople in Russia
Asian Games competitors for Uzbekistan
FC Spartak Nizhny Novgorod players